Protein kinase C-binding protein NELL2 is an enzyme that in humans is encoded by the NELL2 gene.

This gene encodes a cytoplasmic protein that contains epidermal growth factor (EGF) -like repeats. The encoded heterotrimeric protein may be involved in cell growth regulation and differentiation. A similar protein in rodents is involved in craniosynostosis. An alternative splice variant has been described but its full length sequence has not been determined.

References

Further reading

Human proteins